Lottery payouts are the way lottery winnings are distributed. Typically, lotteries pay out around 50–70% of stakes (turnover) back to players. The remainder is then kept for administration costs and charitable donations or tax revenues. In gambling terminology lottery payouts are the equivalent of RTP (Returns To Players). A lottery operator's gross margin is: 100% minus RTP. 

In the US, large lottery winnings generally are advertised as an annuity amount, paid in 20 or more installments; in most cases, a cash option is available. The cash option in the US can be 40–60% of the advertised annuity amount.

Specific payouts for any single draw deviate from the expected payout advertised before a draw, and depends especially on if the jackpot is hit. Typically jackpot amounts that are not hit or paid out are then rolled over to the next draw. In this sense, typical RTP or returns to player percentages will vary with the size of the jackpot. It can happen that after several rollovers, RTP exceeds 100%, so that if you were to buy every single ticket you would probably make a profit. (Actually achieving a net profit depends on: taxes; your chances of sharing the jackpot with another player; and whether you are taking the cash or annuity option.)

Legislation varies by US jurisdiction; many statutes specify a minimum payout percentage. To make lotteries competitive, some jurisdictions increase payout percentages versus those of a neighboring lottery. The percentage changes are likely due to competition from illegal numbers on daily numbers games.

See also 
 Lottery
 Lump sum
 Structured settlement
 Annuity (finance theory)

References

Lotteries